Helen Leslie Smith  (born 31 July 1953) is an Australian fencer. She competed in the women's individual foil events at the 1976, 1980 and 1984 Summer Olympics. She was a long-standing member of the VRI Fencing Club before joining other clubs in the 1990s. On 10 October 2009, in recognition of her services to the Federation Internationale d'Escrime (FIE), the Australian Fencing Federation and selection to three Olympiad, she was inducted to the VRI Hall of Fame.

References

1953 births
Living people
Australian female foil fencers
Olympic fencers of Australia
Fencers at the 1976 Summer Olympics
Fencers at the 1980 Summer Olympics
Fencers at the 1984 Summer Olympics
Members of the Order of Australia
People from Victoria (Australia)